Zachary R. Mider has been a reporter for Bloomberg News since 2006. He also worked for  The Providence Journal in Rhode Island. In 2015 he was awarded the Pulitzer prize for Explanatory Reporting "for a painstaking, clear and entertaining explanation of how so many U.S. corporations dodge taxes and why lawmakers and regulators have a hard time stopping them." In 2019, he received the Gerald Loeb Award for Explanatory for "Sign Here to Lose Everything".

Mider  was born in upstate New York. He attended Deep Springs College and received a bachelor's degree in Social Studies from Harvard College. He lives in New Jersey with his wife Kristen Joyce and three children: John, Mary, and Emily.

External links
 Personal website: zachmider.com

References

Bloomberg L.P. people
Harvard University alumni
Deep Springs College alumni
Living people
Place of birth missing (living people)
Journalists from New York (state)
Journalists from New Jersey
Pulitzer Prize for Explanatory Journalism winners
Year of birth missing (living people)
Gerald Loeb Award winners for Explanatory